George Robson (February 24, 1909 – September 2, 1946) was a British born, naturalized American racing driver active in the 1940s. Born in Newcastle upon Tyne, England, Robson later moved to the Mount Dennis section of York, Ontario, Canada and finally to the United States in 1924, with his family settling in Huntington Park, California.

Robson was the winner of the 1946 Indianapolis 500, the first edition following World War II, but died later that year with George Barringer in an accident at Lakewood Speedway in Atlanta, Georgia. He was very much at his peak at the time of his death. He had qualified for pole for that race and performed strongly since his surprise '500 victory. Robson's brother Hal also competed in the Indy 500. Robson was the last Indianapolis 500 winner to die in the same year as his victory until 2011 when fellow Englishman turned American citizen Dan Wheldon died in a crash at Las Vegas Motor Speedway.

Complete AAA Championship Car results

Indianapolis 500 results

References

Profile at Motorsport Memorial

1909 births
1946 deaths
Racing drivers from Ontario
Indianapolis 500 drivers
Indianapolis 500 winners
Sportspeople from Newcastle upon Tyne
Racing drivers who died while racing
Sports deaths in Georgia (U.S. state)
AAA Championship Car drivers